The Illegal Migration Bill is a proposed act of the United Kingdom House of Commons, introduced by the Secretary of State for the Home Department, Suella Braverman, in March 2023. The main focus of the bill is to reduce or end "small boat crossings", across the English Channel, by ways described as "pushing against international law". 

The legislation proposes to detain and remove those from the UK who arrive in that country by illegal means, as well as blocking them from returning. Its announcement follows a sharp increase in the number of migrants crossing the English Channel by boat, which increased from 300 annually in 2018 to 45,000 in 2022, and 3,150 as of March 2023. This issue was one of five key priorities outlined in January 2023 by prime minister Rishi Sunak, who tweeted: "If you come here illegally, you can't claim asylum. You can't benefit from our modern slavery protections. You can't make spurious human rights claims and you can't stay." The proposed bill has been met with backlash from UK rights groups and United Nations agencies, and questions about its legality have been raised.

The bill drew criticism from BBC sports presenter Gary Lineker, who posted tweets about the plans, including one in which he described its language as "not dissimilar to that used by Germany in the 30s". The BBC subsequently removed him from his presenting role on Match of the Day, saying Lineker's statement violated their impartiality policy. The company's actions led to other journalists and commentators withdrawing in support of Lineker.

See also 
 Immigration policy of the United Kingdom
 Rwanda asylum plan

References

External links 
 Text of the bill at UK Parliament

2023 in British politics
2023 in British law
Home Office (United Kingdom)
Immigration law in the United Kingdom
Immigration to the United Kingdom
March 2023 events in the United Kingdom